Edmund Daundy (by 1468 – 6 May 1515), of Ipswich, Suffolk, was an English politician and Ipswich merchant.

He was a Member of Parliament (MP) for Ipswich in 1512 and 1515.

In 1509 he founded a chantry chapel located in St Lawrence Church, Ipswich. what has become Chantry Park, Ipswich.

His son, Robert Daundy, was also subsequently MP for Ipswich.

References

15th-century births
1515 deaths
Members of the Parliament of England (pre-1707) for Ipswich
English MPs 1512–1514
English MPs 1515